Tataf Rud (also Romanized as Taţaf Rūd; also known as Taţaf Rūd-e Ālīān, and Tatavrut) is a village in Aliyan Rural District, Sardar-e Jangal District, Fuman County, Gilan Province, Iran. At the 2006 census, its population was 373, in 103 families.

References 

Populated places in Fuman County